Francis Wallace Mackenzie (1824 – 5 December 1892) was a 19th-century Member of Parliament from Otago, New Zealand.

Mackenzie was born in Ross-shire, Scotland, in 1824. Aged 16, he sailed to India with the East India Company. He left just before the Indian Rebellion of 1857 and bought land at the Pomahaka River in Otago, New Zealand. There, he set up his farm 'Glenkenich', and the locality, near Tapanui, is now known as Pomahaka. Mackenzie served as a member of the Otago Provincial Council.

At the  Mackenzie stood in the  electorate, and was initially declared the winner with a one-vote majority. However, a recount resulted in the result being reversed, with Hugh Valentine being elected.

Mackenzie died at his home, Glenkenich Station, on 5 December 1892.

References

1824 births
1892 deaths
People from Ross and Cromarty
Scottish emigrants to New Zealand
Members of the Otago Provincial Council
Members of the New Zealand House of Representatives
New Zealand MPs for South Island electorates
Unsuccessful candidates in the 1884 New Zealand general election
Unsuccessful candidates in the 1887 New Zealand general election
Place of birth missing
19th-century New Zealand politicians